Silvaseius is a genus of mites in the Phytoseiidae family.

Species
 Silvaseius barretoae (Yoshida-Shaul & Chant, 1991)

References

Phytoseiidae